Koenen is a patronymic surname of Low German or Dutch origin derived from the given name Koen (Conrad).

Notable people with the surname include:

 Adolf von Koenen (1837–1915), German geologist
 Bernard Koenen (1889–1964), Communist and East German politician
 Breanna Koenen (born 1994), Australian rules footballer
 Emmy Damerius-Koenen (1903–1987), East German politician
 Gerd Koenen (born 1944), German historian and former communist
 Heinrich Koenen (1910–1945), German anti-fascist fighter and Soviet agent
  (1893–1956), Dutch neurologist who described Koenen's tumor
 Karestan Koenen (born 1968), American epidemiologist
  (born 1931), German-born American philologist and papyrologist
 Lyle Koenen (born 1956), American politician in Minnesota
  (1849–1924), German civil engineer
 Michael Koenen (born 1982), American football player
 Theo Koenen (1890–1964), German footballer
 Vera Koenen (born 1967), Dutch volleyball player
 Wilhelm Koenen (1886–1963), Communist and East German politician
Koene
Isaac Koene (1637–1713), Dutch landscape painter
Randal A. Koene (born 1971), Dutch neuroscientist

See also
 Coenen
 Koenders

References

Dutch-language surnames
Low German surnames
Patronymic surnames